Andrea Lorenzo Grassi (20 December 1890 – 5 February 1980) was an Italian miner known as Lawrence Grassi. He moved to Canada in 1912, taking on work with the Canadian Pacific Railway (CPR), before settling down in Canmore, Alberta, in 1916. There he worked as a miner, until he retired. Grassi became well known for his passion for the mountains, building hiking trails around Canmore and Lake O'Hara, Yoho National Park. Several plaques have been emplaced at these trails to recognize Grassi for this work. 

Numerous places bear his name, such as Mount Lawrence Grassi, Grassi Knob, Grassi Lakes, and Lawrence Grassi Middle School.

References 

Canmore, Alberta
Italian mountain climbers
Mountain guides
Italian miners
1890 births
1980 deaths
People from Piedmont